Al Sha'ab Sana'a is a football club playing in Yemen. Al Sha'ab San'a Stadium is their home, it has a capacity of 5,000.

Managerial history
Last update: 21 February 2014.
 Mohammed Banaja (20??–14)
 Mustafa Hassan (2014–)

References

Football clubs in Yemen